Flitah or Meshrefah is a Syrian village in the An-Nabek District of the Rif Dimashq Governorate. According to the Syria Central Bureau of Statistics (CBS), Flitah had a population of 6,475 in the 2004 census. Its inhabitants are predominantly Sunni Muslims.

References

Bibliography

Populated places in An-Nabek District